Ccarhuarazo or Qarwarasu (Quechua, qarwa leaf worm; larva of a beetle; pale, yellowish, golden, Ancash Quechua rasu snow, ice, mountain with snow, Hispanicized spelling Ccarhuarazo) is a  mountain in the Chunta mountain range in the Andes of Peru. It is located in the Huancavelica Region, Castrovirreyna Province, Santa Ana District, and in the Huancavelica Province, Huancavelica District. Ccarhuarazo is situated southeast of Kuntur Wamani and  Wamanrasu. Its highest peak is on the border of the provinces. Two other peaks which reach  and more than  lie to the northeast in the Huancavelica District.

References

Mountains of Huancavelica Region
Mountains of Peru